Sabino Acquaviva (29 April 1927 – 29 December 2015) was an Italian sociologist. He was chair of the Department of Sociology between 1985 and 1988  and president of the School of Political Science of University of Padua between 1977 and 1978. He was also visiting professor at All Souls College, Oxford and at the University of Nice, scriptwriter, and novelist. He is mostly well-known for his studies about secularization and the decline of religion in Western Europe. 

Acquaviva died on 29 December 2015 in his hometown of Padua, Italy.

References

1927 births
2015 deaths
Italian sociologists
Academic staff of the University of Padua
Italian expatriates in the United Kingdom
Italian expatriates in France